SES Saran Solar Plant is a photovoltaic power station with a total capacity of 100 MWp which corresponds to an annual production of approximately 140.116 GWh.

Environmental impact 
The plant will help reduce  emissions by 93,500 tonnes per year, according to the European Bank for Reconstruction and Development.

References

External links 
 Interactive scholarly application, multimodal resources mashup (publications, images, videos)

Photovoltaic power stations
Solar power stations in Kazakhstan
Energy infrastructure completed in 2019
Buildings and structures in Karaganda Region